{{DISPLAYTITLE:C6518H10008N1724O2032S38}}
The molecular formula C6518H10008N1724O2032S38 (molar mass: 146250.008 g/mol) may refer to:

 Sifalimumab
 Tabalumab